Maximillian Michael Brooks (born May 22, 1972) is an American actor and author. He is the son of comedy filmmaker Mel Brooks and actress Anne Bancroft. Much of Brooks's writing focuses on zombie stories. He is a senior fellow at the Modern War Institute at West Point, New York.

Early life
Brooks was born on May 22, 1972, in Manhattan, New York City. He is the son of actress Anne Bancroft and actor, director, producer, and  writer Mel Brooks. His father is Jewish, while his mother was an Italian-American Catholic.

Brooks is dyslexic and recalled that during the time in which he was growing up:

Brooks attended Crossroads School in Santa Monica, California. He studied at Pitzer College in Claremont, California, where he earned a bachelor's degree in history. He also attended graduate school, studying film at American University in Washington, D.C.

Career

Writing 
From 2001 to 2003, Brooks was a member of the writing team at Saturday Night Live.

In 2003, Brooks wrote his first book, The Zombie Survival Guide, a satirical survival manual about zombies. In 2006, Brooks wrote the follow-up World War Z: An Oral History of the Zombie War, a novel on the same subject, set in the ten years following a zombie apocalypse. Paramount Pictures acquired the movie rights, and Brad Pitt's production company, Plan B Entertainment, produced the film. In the October 2006 issue of Fangoria Magazine, Brooks stated that he would not be writing the screenplay for the motion picture, as he felt he was not an accomplished enough screenwriter to "do it right" (J. Michael Straczynski wrote the first version of the screenplay).

Brooks wrote the introduction for the hardcover collected edition of Dynamite Entertainment's zombie miniseries Raise the Dead, released in 2007.

In 2010, Brooks wrote the IDW comic book mini-series G.I. Joe: Hearts & Minds.

In 2012, he published Closure, Limited and Other Zombie Tales, featuring the story of that name from The New Dead, along with three other short stories set in the World War Z universe.

In 2014, Broadway Books published The Harlem Hellfighters, a graphic novel which portrays a fictionalized account of the African American 369th Infantry Regiment's experiences in World War I, written by Brooks and illustrated by Caanan White. Sony Pictures has purchased the rights to create a film of the novel, with Caleeb Pinkett and James Lassiter producing on behalf of Overbrook Entertainment.

He wrote the story for the 2016 film The Great Wall, starring Matt Damon.

In 2016, Brooks was invited to MineCon and announced that he was working on a new novel based on Minecraft, titled Minecraft: The Island, and in 2021, he published the sequel, Minecraft: The Mountain.

In August 2019, Brooks' announced a new book, entitled Devolution: A Firsthand Account of the Rainier Sasquatch Massacre, about the cryptid Bigfoot. It was released on June 16, 2020.

Acting and voice-over work 
Brooks has a number of other creative credits. As an actor, he has been seen in Roseanne, To Be or Not to Be, Pacific Blue, and 7th Heaven. He also has a career voicing animation: his voice has been featured in the animated shows Batman Beyond, Buzz Lightyear of Star Command, Justice League, and All Dogs Go to Heaven: The Series. During the start of the 3rd season of Lost Tapes, he was cast as himself in the zombie episode, telling the audience about how zombies come to be. He also appeared on Spike TV series Deadliest Warrior, in which he represented the zombie team in the "Vampires vs. Zombies" episode, as one of the Zombie experts along with Matt Mogk, founder of the Zombie Research Society.

Personal life
Brooks has been married to playwright Michelle Kholos since 2003. They have one son, Henry Michael Brooks (born March 2005), and live in Venice, California. In October 2020, Brooks and his son appeared in a short video featuring Mel Brooks making his first political video at age 94 to endorse Joe Biden for president.

Filmography

Bibliography

Prose
 The Zombie Survival Guide (2003)
 World War Z (2006)
 Closure, Limited and Other Zombie Tales (2011)
 Minecraft: The Island (2018)
 Devolution (2020)
 Minecraft: The Mountain (March 2, 2021)

Comics
 The Zombie Survival Guide: Recorded Attacks (2009)
 G.I. Joe: Hearts and Minds (2010)
 The Harlem Hellfighters (2014)
 The Extinction Parade (2014)
 A More Perfect Union (2016)
 Germ Warfare: A Very Graphic History (2019)

References

External links

 
 
 
 
 

1972 births
Living people
20th-century American male actors
21st-century American male actors
American comics writers
American humorists
American male film actors
American male television actors
American male television writers
American male voice actors
American male writers
American people of German-Jewish descent
American writers of Italian descent
American people of Ukrainian-Jewish descent
American television writers
American University alumni
Crossroads School alumni
Writers with dyslexia
Actors with dyslexia
Male actors from New York City
Pitzer College alumni
Primetime Emmy Award winners
Screenwriters from California
Screenwriters from New York (state)